Bat Conservation International (BCI) is an international nongovernmental organization working to conserve bats and their habitats through conservation, education, and research efforts.

BCI was founded in 1982 by bat biologist Merlin Tuttle, who led the organization until his retirement in 2009. Since its establishment, BCI has formed partnerships with the U.S. Fish and Wildlife Service and many national and international agencies and nonprofits, and has produced publications, workshops, scholarships, and research, and site-specific projects in the US and internationally. BCI employs a staff of 30 biologists, educators, and administrators and has members in 60 countries.

Conservation strategies
BCI operates by its "10 critical conservation strategies":
1) Accelerating scientific research
2) Preventing extinction
3) Protecting intact areas with highly diverse bat communities
4) Preserving megapopulations of bats
5) Creating global and regional partnerships
6) Addressing threats impacting multiple species at multiple sites
7) Promoting community-based bat conservation
8) Creating and enforcing legal and policy frameworks 
9) Developing and perfecting important technology
10) Investing in future conservation leadership

Addressing serious threats
BCI funds and participates in research to mitigate damage to bat populations. Some of the threats previously or currently addressed include:
The effects of uranium mines on bats that use them as roosts
Ways to reduce bat mortality from wind turbines
Mass mortality from white-nose syndrome
Guano mining in bat caves

Protecting megapopulations
Being colonial, many bat species form colonies that can consist of millions of individuals.
Because some bat species are highly aggregated, entire species can be threatened by disturbance to a small number of roosts. BCI seeks to protect these roosts of high aggregations, or "mega-populations." Some ways that BCI works to protect megapopulations are:
Determining the effects of cave gates on bat usage of caves
Purchasing land with important caves, such as Bracken Cave, home of the world's largest bat colony
Using education and outreach to protect bat roosts from purposeful eradication, such as the colony at the Congress Avenue Bridge that was initially unwelcome

Preventing extinction
In their 2014–2018 Strategic Plan, BCI identified 35 critically endangered or endangered species of bats as priority species that will receive a concentrated focus of research and conservation efforts to hopefully prevent their extinction. BCI is also a member of the Alliance for Zero Extinction, which seeks to safeguard the last habitats of critically endangered species.

In 2022, Bat Conservation International (BCI) has employed the use of high accuracy workflow via GIS (Global Information System) to survey abandoned mines in New Mexico. They survey habitats that can support favorable conditions (right moisture and temperature, absence of predators, and other factors); protecting habitats helps the native population of bats to avoid extinction. BCI has a team of 30 employees who manages the preservation of 35 endangered bat species with 3 species endemic to the United States. In conjunction with the Bureau of Land Management (BLM) and other government regional land management organizations, BCI collects data to locate  these sites. Moreover, topographical maps  provided by the USGS (United States Geological Service) and two Arrow 100 Global Navigation satellites  System (GNSS) have been used to navigate terrains and locate entrances or gateways to prospective abandon mines that can be used by the bat populations. Sites are then evaluated by using Survey123 ( a data collection application) to analyze and disseminate data (temperature, humidity, guano concentrations that determines concentration of food sources, etc.). 785 mines in the vicinity of Palomas Gap, Timber Mountain, Rincon Basin, Burbank Canyon, and Brushy Mountain have been selected by the BCI team as candidate locations. As reported from the ArcNews Winter 2022 issue, BCI has completed evaluating about 308 sites that yielded 8  habitats with evidence of bat activity.

Political advocacy
In addition to promoting scientific research on bats and their conservation, BCI is also involved in public policy. BCI announces opposition to legislation to mobilize its members against it, such as with Pennsylvania House Bill 1576, which would have changed how threatened and endangered species are protected in the state. In the future, BCI plans to increase its engagement in legislative and policy efforts to conserve bats.

See also 
 Bats of the United States
 Conservation movement
 List of bat conservation and research groups
 List of conservation issues

References

External links 
 Bat Conservation International

Bat conservation
Organizations based in Austin, Texas
Organizations established in 1982
Environmental organizations based in Texas
1982 establishments in Texas